Igor Popović (Serbian Cyrillic: Игор Поповић; born 10 August 1983) is a Serbian footballer.

Career
He signed a contract with Poli in the summer of 2010, but the contract was mutually terminated and he became a free agent.

References

1983 births
Living people
Sportspeople from Subotica
Serbian footballers
FK Spartak Subotica players
FK Smederevo players
FK Voždovac players
Serbian SuperLiga players
FC Politehnica Timișoara players
Liga I players
Association football defenders